Rai Storia (English: Rai History) is an Italian television channel owned by Rai Cultura, an arm of broadcaster RAI available on digital terrestrial television in Italy. Launched on 17 June 2002 as Rai Edu 2, the channel adopted its current name on 2 February 2009 and it is broadcast in Italy on DTT channel 54 on mux Rai 4.

In May 2016 the channel stopped broadcasting advertisements. Since then it is funded solely by the license fee.

Logos and identities

Programming
The channel broadcasts the program La storia siamo noi and documentaries about history and culture from Rai Educational and Rai Teche.

See also 
RAI
Rai Scuola
Rai 5

References

External links 
 Rai Storia Official Site 
 

Free-to-air
Storia
Commercial-free television networks
Italian-language television stations
Television channels and stations established in 2009
Documentary television channels